Deutsches Weintor eG v Land Rheinland-Pfalz (2012) C-544/10 is an EU law case, concerning the free movement of services in the European Union.

Facts
The Rheinland-Pfalz food regulator claimed that a wine cooperative in Ilbesheim bei Landau in der Pfalz should not describe its wine as ‘easily digestible’ (‘bekömmlich’), accompanied by a reference to the wine's reduced acidity level, because that was a ‘health claim’ under Regulation No 1924/2006 art 2(2)(5), and should therefore not be allowed generally for alcoholic beverages. Deutsches Weintor argued they were making a claim of general well-being, not health.

The Bundesverwaltungsgericht (Federal Administrative Court) referred to the CJEU, suggesting that ‘easily digestible’ was not a health claim, but a comparative claim about the effect of the wine compared to others, and asked what the status might be regarding CFREU articles 15 and 16 (freedom to choose an occupation and run a business).

Judgment
The Court of Justice, Third Chamber held that the concept of a ‘health claim’ did also cover terms such as ‘easily digestible’. One had to regard, not just CFREU articles 15 and 16 but also article 35 on a high level of health protection.

See also

European Union law

Notes

References

European Union services case law
2012 in case law
2012 in Germany
Advertising regulation
Alcohol in Germany